Dean Marlowe (born July 25, 1992) is an American football safety who is a free agent. He was signed by the Carolina Panthers as an undrafted free agent following the 2015 NFL Draft. He played college football at James Madison University.

High school career
As a senior, Marlowe played quarterback and safety on the football team at Holy Cross High School. He along with Stanford wide receiver Devon Cajuste helped lead the Knights to the CHSAA Semi final game where they lost to the third-ranked team in the state St. Anthony's by a score of 27–7. Holy Cross finished the season ranked 18th in the state. Rivals gave him a two-star rating when he signed with James Madison University.

College career
Marlowe played for the James Madison Dukes from 2011 to 2014. He was redshirted in 2010. He recorded career totals of 326 tackles, 12 interceptions and 30 passes defended in 48 games played. He earned First-team All-CAA honors in 2012 and 2014. Marlowe also garnered Second-team All-CAA recognition in 2013 and Third-team honors in 2011.

Professional career

Carolina Panthers
Following the 2015 NFL Draft, Marlowe was signed by the Carolina Panthers as an undrafted free agent. He made the team's 53-man roster on September 5, 2015.

On February 7, 2016, Marlowe's Panthers played in Super Bowl 50. He was inactive for the game as the Panthers fell to the Denver Broncos by a score of 24–10.

On September 20, 2016, Marlowe was placed on injured reserve with a hamstring injury.

On August 8, 2017, Marlowe was waived/injured by the Panthers and placed on injured reserve. He was released on August 15, 2017.

Buffalo Bills
On December 5, 2017, Marlowe was signed to the Buffalo Bills' practice squad. He signed a reserve/future contract with the Bills on January 8, 2018.

On September 1, 2018, Marlowe was waived by the Bills and was signed to the practice squad the next day. He was promoted to the active roster on October 6, 2018. He was waived on October 9, 2018 and was re-signed to the practice squad. He was promoted back to the active roster on December 12, 2018.

On March 26, 2020, Marlowe re-signed with the Bills. He was released as a part of final roster cuts on September 5, 2020, but re-signed again the next day following some roster adjustments. In Week 8 of the 2020 season against the New England Patriots, Marlowe recovered a fumble forced by teammate Justin Zimmer on Cam Newton late in the fourth quarter to secure a 24–21 Bills' win. Marlowe was placed on the reserve/COVID-19 list by the team on November 14, 2020, and activated on November 19.
In Week 16 against the New England Patriots on Monday Night Football, Marlowe recorded his first career sack on Cam Newton during the 38–9 win.
In Week 17 against the Miami Dolphins, Marlowe intercepted two passes thrown by Tua Tagovailoa during the 56–26 win.

Detroit Lions
On April 8, 2021, Marlowe signed with the Detroit Lions. He played in 16 games with nine starts, recording 67 tackles and two passes defensed.

Atlanta Falcons
On March 31, 2022, Marlowe signed a one-year contract with the Atlanta Falcons.

Buffalo Bills (second stint)
On November 1, 2022, the Atlanta Falcons traded Marlowe to the Buffalo Bills (whom Marlowe was with from 2017-2020) in exchange for a 2023 7th-round draft pick.

Career statistics

References

External links
 James Madison Dukes bio
 Atlanta Falcons bio

1992 births
Living people
Sportspeople from Queens, New York
Players of American football from New York City
American football safeties
James Madison University alumni
James Madison Dukes football players
Carolina Panthers players
Buffalo Bills players
Detroit Lions players
Atlanta Falcons players
Holy Cross High School (Flushing) alumni